North Carlton may refer to:

 North Carlton, Lincolnshire, a village in Lincolnshire, England
 North Carlton, Nottinghamshire, a suburb of Carlton in Lindrick, England
 Carlton North, Victoria, a suburb of Melbourne, Australia